Ram Caspi (b. Israel, 1939), is a prominent Israeli attorney. He received his LL.M (cum laude) from the Hebrew University of Jerusalem (1962), and was admitted to the Israel Bar in 1964.

Caspi's expertise is in international transactions and Mergers & Acquisitions, as well as in civil litigation. He also practices Commercial and Property Law. He is the head of Caspi & Co. and son of the late Adv. Michael Caspi.

References

External links
 Caspi & Co.

Israeli Jews
Israeli jurists
Hebrew University of Jerusalem Faculty of Law alumni
People from Jerusalem
1939 births
Living people